Fabio Gstrein (born 14 June 1997) is an Austrian World Cup alpine ski racer and specializes in slalom.

Biography
Gstrein won a silver medal in slalom at the 2018 Junior World Championships, held in Davos, Switzerland, and has represented Austria at two World Championships.

He is a distant relative of Bernhard Gstrein (b.1965), a former World Cup alpine racer.

World Cup results

Season standings

Top five results

 0 podiums, 2 top fives (2 SL), 10 top tens

World Championship results

References

External links

1997 births
Living people
Austrian male alpine skiers